Robert Henry Whitfield (September 14, 1814 – October 5, 1868) was a prominent Confederate politician.

He was born in Nansemond County, Virginia, in what is today Suffolk, Virginia on September 14, 1814. He was a delegate to the Virginia Secession Convention from Isle of Wight County, Virginia. He represented the state in the Second Confederate Congress. He died in Smithfield, Virginia on October 5, 1868.

External links
PoliticalGraveyard.com

Members of the Confederate House of Representatives from Virginia
19th-century American politicians
Virginia Secession Delegates of 1861
1814 births
1868 deaths
People from Suffolk, Virginia
People from Isle of Wight County, Virginia